Fouzi Al-Shehri (born 15 May 1980) is a Saudi Arabian former football player.

He played most of his career for Al Ahli, though some of his career was with Al-Qadisiyah FC.

He played for the Saudi Arabia national football team and was a participant at the 2002 FIFA World Cup.

References

External links

1980 births
Living people
Saudi Arabian footballers
Saudi Arabia international footballers
2002 FIFA World Cup players
2000 AFC Asian Cup players
Al-Ahli Saudi FC players
Al-Qadsiah FC players
Association football defenders
Saudi Professional League players